Páirc Mac Uílín is a Gaelic Athletic Association playing field in Ballycastle, County Antrim, Northern Ireland. It is the home of the McQuillan GAC Ballycastle club, one of the most successful teams in the county. The grounds have two full size pitches, floodlight facilities, a training area, a Hurling wall as well as multi-purpose clubrooms. The club also has a wind turbine installed on site.

It officially opened in 2007, the centenary year of McQuillan GAC Ballycastle, with GAA President Nickey Brennan, newly installed Ulster President Tom Daly and Antrim chairman Dr John McSparron in attendance. The first match was a friendly between the home side and Kilkenny club James Stephens. In December 2012 Páirc MacUílín received the Antrim and Ulster GAA Ground of the Year awards.

During the redevelopment of Casement Park, Páirc MacUílín hosted the senior Antrim county hurling team from 2014 to 2016. It was also selected as the location for the Antrim Senior Hurling Championship finals in 2013, 2014 and 2016.

Matches from three different senior inter county competitions have been held at the venue, including the National Hurling League, Leinster Senior Hurling Championship and the All-Ireland Senior Hurling Championship.

Antrim Senior Hurling Championship Finals at Páirc MacUílín

Inter county matches at Páirc MacUílín

Antrim's record at Páirc MacUílín

Awards

 Antrim GAA Ground of the Year 2012, 2015
 Ulster GAA Ground of the Year 2012

References

Antrim GAA
Gaelic games grounds in Northern Ireland
Sports venues in County Antrim